Plesiosejus is a genus of mites in the family Ascidae.

Species
 Plesiosejus italicus (Berlese, 1905)

References

Ascidae